Altocumulus floccus is a cloud type named for its tuft-like, wooly appearance. They often form in clusters, or patches, and bases can vary in height with differing atmospheric conditions within the PBL. They are similar to Altocumulus castellanus, but often have a shallower vertical extent in comparison.

Floccus clouds form when in the presence of conditional, often shallow, mid-level instability. On some occasions, such as the presence of a deeper unstable layer, these clouds can grow large enough to develop into thunderstorms.

References 

Cumulus